Mohamed "Mat" Noh Hussein (1953/1954 – 20 September 2021) was a Singaporean footballer who played as a forward. He represented the Singapore national team, winning the Malaysia Cup in 1977 and being runner-up in 1981.

In 1977, Mat Noh scored the winning goal, a penalty, against Malaysia in a 1978 FIFA World Cup qualification match held in Singapore.

Personal life
He married singer Rahimah Rahim in 1977, with whom he had one daughter. They divorced in 1988.

Death
On 20 September 2021, Mat Noh died after having suffered a heart attack the previous day.

References

1950s births
Year of birth missing
2021 deaths
Singaporean footballers
Singapore international footballers
Association football forwards